Ian Gilmour (1926–2007) was a Conservative politician in the United Kingdom.

Ian Gilmour may also refer to:

Ian Gilmour (actor), New Zealand-born actor
Ian Gilmour (athlete), of the 1971 International Cross Country Championships

See also
Ian Gilmore  (born 1947), professor of hepatology